April Brockman - Del Monte (born May 29, 1986) is a Canadian reality television personality who received international recognition as the winner of The Bachelor Canada in season two.

Life and career
April was cast on the Canadian television series, The Bachelor Canada. In 2014, she won season 2 of the Canadian reality television series which aired on the W Network. Prior to being a television personality, she built a career in the real estate industry. 

In May 2020, April published her first book titled How to Thrive as a Real Estate Agent. In February 2022, she founded  The 6 Figure Realtor Program and  also  created informative blog series & social media community  tagged  
Women Who Thrive In Real Estate.

Personal life
In December 2017, April became engaged to Canadian Film Director, Michael Del Monte and creator of award-winning film Transformer. They were married on June 30, 2018 and later had a baby boy in 2019.

See also
 The Bachelor Canada
 The Bachelor Canada (season 2)

References

External links
 
 Women Who Thrive In Real Estate
  The 6 Figure Realtor Accelerator Program

Living people
1986 births
Businesspeople from Toronto
Canadian television personalities
Canadian real estate businesspeople